
Niki may refer to:

People
 Niki (given name)
 NIKI (singer), Indonesian singer and songwriter
 Niki DeMar, American singer
 Niki Etsuko (1928–1986), Japanese author of mystery fiction

Places 
 Niki, Hokkaido, a town in Japan
 Niki, Greece, a village in Greece

Other uses 
 Niki (airline), formerly a passenger airline based at Vienna Airport in Austria, which ceased trading in 2017
 Operation Niki, a Greek airlift operation during the Turkish invasion of Cyprus in 1974
 Niki Rotor Aviation, a Bulgarian aircraft manufacturer
 , a Greek cargo ship in service 1920-37
 Niki and Gabi, an American singing duo
 Niki and the Dove, a Swedish indietronica group
 niki.ai, an Indian ecommerce platform

See also 
 Nike (disambiguation)
 Nikki (disambiguation)
 Nicki (disambiguation)